The World of Tibetan Buddhism is a 1995 book written by the Dalai Lama, translated and edited by Geshe Thupten Jinpa, in which he offers a clear and penetrating overview of Tibetan Buddhist practice from the Four Noble Truths to Highest Yoga Tantra.

See also

Gelug
Geshe Thupten Jinpa
Tibetan Buddhism

Bibliography
 Tenzin Gyatso, (1995). The World of Tibetan Buddhism: An Overview of its Philosophy and Practice, Wisdom Publications, Massachusetts,

External links
The World of Tibetan Buddhism

Books by the 14th Dalai Lama
1995 non-fiction books